Paya Pichkah (born 21 March 2000) is a Swedish footballer who plays as a midfielder for GIF Sundsvall in Allsvenskan.

Club career

GIF Sundsvall
Paya Pichkah made his Allsvenskan debut for GIF Sundsvall on 3 April 2022 during the 2022 season against IK Sirius at the Studenternas IP.

International career

Youth
Pichkah has played for the Sweden national under-17 football team in 2017 against Slovakia, Norway, and Romania, and has played for the Sweden national under-19 football team in 2018 where he was called up for their  2019 UEFA European Under-19 Championship qualification campaign.

References

External links 

2000 births
Living people
People from Qaem Shahr
People from Sundsvall
Swedish footballers
Iranian footballers
Iranian emigrants to Sweden
Swedish people of Iranian descent
Sportspeople of Iranian descent
Association football midfielders
GIF Sundsvall players
Allsvenskan players
Superettan players
Sportspeople from Mazandaran province